The ARIA Singles Chart ranks the best-performing singles in Australia. Its data, published by the Australian Recording Industry Association, is based collectively on each single's weekly physical and digital sales. In 2007, 14 singles claimed the top spot, including Beyoncé's "Irreplaceable", which started its peak position in late 2006. Nine acts achieved their first number-one single in Australia, either as a lead or featured artist: Evermore, Hinder, Jay-Z, Fergie, Sean Kingston, Timbaland, Keri Hilson, The Veronicas and OneRepublic.

Timbaland earned two number-one singles during the year for "The Way I Are" and "Apologize". Fergie's "Big Girls Don't Cry" was the longest-running number-one single of 2007, having topped the ARIA Singles Chart for nine consecutive weeks. Hinder's "Lips of an Angel" topped the chart for seven consecutive weeks, while Avril Lavigne's "Girlfriend", Rihanna's "Umbrella", and Timbaland's "Apologize" each spent six weeks at the number-one spot. Kingston's "Beautiful Girls" spent five weeks at number one and Silverchair's "Straight Lines" topped the chart for four weeks. Kylie Minogue also achieved her tenth number-one in Australia in 2007, with "2 Hearts" spending one week at the top of the charts.

Chart history

Number-one artists

See also
2007 in music
List of number-one albums of 2007 (Australia)
List of top 25 singles for 2007 in Australia
List of top 10 singles for 2007 in Australia

References

Number-one singles
Australia Singles
2007